Mazartag (Uyghur: مازارتاغ, Мазартағ, Mazartagh; , Ma-cha-t’a-ko) is an arc-shaped mountain range located in the western part of Tarim Basin, between the Hotan and Yarkand river valleys, Xinjiang, China. It is some 145 km long and 3 to 5 km wide; the highest peak rises to 1,635 m. The range is mainly composed of sandstone.

Historical maps
Historical English-language maps including Mazartag:

See also
 Mazar Tagh

Notes

References

Mountain ranges of Xinjiang